Clişcăuţi may refer to several places in Moldova:

 Clişcăuţi, a village in Hincăuţi Commune, Edineţ district
 Clişcăuţi, a village in Prepeliţa Commune, Sîngerei district

and to:

 Clișcăuți, the Romanian name for Klishkivtsi, Chernivtsi Oblast, Ukraine